"What We Do" is a song by American rapper Freeway. It was released on September 3, 2002, as the lead single from his debut studio album Philadelphia Freeway (2003). The song features American rappers Jay-Z and Beanie Sigel. It was produced by Just Blaze and contains a sample of "I Just Can't See Myself Without You" by Creative Source.

Background
In the song, the rappers rap about committing acts that they know are illegal but still doing them in order to survive. In an interview, Freeway stated the song is "talkin' about all the things that we do in the streets is wrong but, of course, there are reasons why we're doing the wrong things that we do".

According to Just Blaze, "What We Do" was one the first songs recorded for the album. Freeway originally planned for the track to be a solo and for Jay-Z to only have an ad-lib on it. Jay came to check on Freeway in the beginning of the album and on the end of the album. He made two visits to the studio. The first time he came to hear the album, Freeway played him "What We Do", and Jay was like, 'I gotta jump on it.' After he did, Beanie Sigel recorded a verse for the song as well.

Music video
The music video was filmed in the Brooklyn Navy Yard and directed by Nzingha Stewart. It is based on the television series The Wire and features cameos from cast members of the show, as well as appearances from Damon Dash, Roc-A-Fella artists, and Beanie Sigel's mother.

Charts

Release history

References

2002 singles
2002 songs
Freeway (rapper) songs
Jay-Z songs
Beanie Sigel songs
Song recordings produced by Just Blaze
Songs written by Jay-Z
Songs written by Beanie Sigel
Songs written by Just Blaze
Songs written by Skip Scarborough
Roc-A-Fella Records singles
Songs about crime